Bábonymegyer is a village in Somogy County, Hungary. Until 1927 it was two separate villages, Nagybábony and Koppánymegyer.

History
Megyer was first mentioned in 1193, Bábon in 1259 in official documents. Its evangelical church was built in 1832 and its altar picture was painted by Gyula Rudnay who also lived in the village. The Reformed church was built in 1768 and its ceiling painting was also made by Gyula Rudnay. According to local legends the Hungarian betyár, Pista Patkó died here. A headboard keeps his memory in the village.

Main sights
 Reformed church - built in 1832
 Evangelical church - built in 1768
 Monument of the First World War

Notable residents
 Gyula Rudnay (1878 – 1957), Hungarian painter, graphic, professor
 Pista Patkó (? - 1862), Hungarian betyár

External links 
 Street map (Hungarian)

References 

Populated places in Somogy County